Roger Sherman (April 19, 1721 – July 23, 1793) was an American statesman, lawyer, and a Founding Father of the United States. He is the only person to sign four of the great state papers of the United States related to the founding: the Continental Association, Declaration of Independence,  Articles of Confederation, and U.S. Constitution. He also signed the 1774 Petition to the King.

Born in Newton, Massachusetts, Sherman established a legal career in Litchfield County, Connecticut, despite a lack of formal education. After a period in the Connecticut House of Representatives, he served as a justice of the Superior Court of Connecticut from 1766 to 1789. He represented Connecticut at the Continental Congress, and he was a member of the Committee of Five that drafted the Declaration of Independence.

Sherman served as a delegate to the 1787 Philadelphia Convention, which produced the United States Constitution. After Benjamin Franklin, he was the second oldest delegate present at the convention. Sherman favored granting the federal government power to raise revenue and regulate commerce, but initially opposed efforts to supplant the Articles of Confederation with a new constitution. After supporting the establishment of a new constitution, Sherman became a key delegate and main opponent of James Madison's Virginia Plan by introducing the Connecticut Compromise that won the approval of both the more and less populous states.

After the ratification of the Constitution, Sherman represented Connecticut in the United States House of Representatives from 1789 to 1791. He served in the United States Senate from 1791 to his death in 1793.

Early life and family

Sherman was born into a family of farmers in Newton, Massachusetts. His father was William and mother Mehetabel Sherman. Sherman's education did not extend beyond his father's library and grammar school, and his early career was spent as a shoemaker. However, he had an aptitude for learning, access to a good library owned by his father, and a Harvard-educated parish minister, Rev. Samuel Dunbar, who took him under his wing.

In 1743, his father's death made Sherman move with his mother and siblings to New Milford, Connecticut, where in partnership with his brother William, he opened the town's first store. He very quickly introduced himself in civil and religious affairs, rapidly becoming one of the town's leading citizens and eventually town clerk of New Milford. He became county surveyor of New Haven County in 1745 and began providing astronomical calculations for almanacs in 1759.

Sherman married twice, and had fifteen children, of whom thirteen reached adulthood. He married Elizabeth Hartwell on November 17, 1749. She died on October 19, 1760, and Sherman married Rebecca (also spelled Rebekah) Prescott on May 12, 1763, and they had eight children: Rebecca, Elizabeth,  Roger, Mehetabel (1st), Mehetabel (2nd), Oliver, Martha and Sarah.

Political career

Early political career
Although Sherman did not attend college, he was urged to read for the bar exam by a local lawyer, and was admitted to the bar of Litchfield, Connecticut, in 1754, during which he wrote "A Caveat Against Injustice" and was chosen to represent New Milford in the Connecticut House of Representatives from 1755 to 1758 and from 1760 to 1761. Sherman was appointed justice of the peace in 1775 and judge of the court of common pleas in 1765. During 1766, Sherman was first elected to the Governor's Council of the Connecticut General Assembly, where he served until 1785. Sherman served as Justice of the Superior Court of Connecticut from 1766 to 1789.

Sherman was also appointed treasurer of Yale College, and awarded an honorary Master of Arts degree. He was a professor of Christian religion for many years, and engaged in lengthy correspondences with some of the theologians of the time. During February 1776, Sherman, George Wythe, and John Adams were members of a committee responsible for establishing guidelines for U.S. Embassy officials in Canada with the committee instructions that included, "You are to declare that we hold sacred the rights of conscience, and may promise to the whole people, solemnly in our name, the free and undisturbed exercise of their religion. And ... that all civil rights and the rights to hold office were to be extended to persons of any Christian denomination." In 1784, Sherman was elected mayor of New Haven, which office he held until his death.

Continental and Confederation Congress

As a member of the First Continental Congress, Sherman signed the Continental Association to impose an economic boycott on British trade. In the Second Continental Congress, Sherman was appointed to the Committee of Five, which was charged with drafting the Declaration of Independence. Sherman was also a member of the committee of 13 that was responsible for preparing a draft constitution for the new nation. During debate, Sherman proposed a bicameral national legislature where states would be represented equally. The committee of 13 rejected Sherman's proposal, adopting a unicameral legislature and what would become the Articles of Confederation. As a member of the Confederation Congress, Sherman was a signatory of the Treaty of Paris which ended the Revolutionary War.

Constitutional Convention
Sherman came into the Convention without the intention of creating a new constitution. He saw the convention as a means to modify the already existing government. Part of his stance was concerned with the public appeal. He defended amending the articles declaring that it was in the best interest of the people and the most probable way the people would accept changes to a constitution. "The problem with the old government was not that it had acted foolishly or threatened anybody's liberties, but that it had simply been unable to enforce its decrees." Sherman advanced the idea that the national government simply needed a way to raise revenue and regulate commerce.

Sherman's views were heavily shaped by Connecticut's position as a particularly isolationist state. Connecticut operated almost without much need from other states, using its own ports to trade with the West Indies instead of utilizing ports in Boston, and feared that "...the mass of people lacked sufficient wisdom to govern themselves and thus wished no branch of the federal government to be elected directly by the people".

His views were also influenced by his personal beliefs and Puritan views. Sherman opposed slavery and used the issue as a tool for negotiation and alliance. He believed that slavery was already gradually being abolished and the trend was moving southward. Sherman saw that the issue of slavery could be one that threatened the success of the Constitutional Convention. Therefore, Sherman helped shape compromises that benefited the slave states in order to obtain unlikely allies from the Carolinas due to the economies of their home states.

Sherman is also known for his stance against paper money with his authoring of Article I, Section 10 of the United States Constitution and his later opposition to James Madison over the Bill of Rights. He believed that these amendments would diminish the role and power of the states over the people.

Mr. Wilson & Mr. Sherman moved to insert after the words "coin money" the words "nor emit bills of credit, nor make any thing but gold & silver coin a tender in payment of debts" making these prohibitions absolute, instead of making the measures allowable (as in the XIII art) with the consent of the Legislature of the U.S. ... Mr. Sherman thought this a favorable crisis for crushing paper money. If the consent of the Legislature could authorize emissions of it, the friends of paper money would make every exertion to get into the Legislature in order to license it."

Sherman also had very little interest in creating an executive branch with much authority. He suggested that no constitutional provision needed be made for the executive because it was "nothing more than an institution for carrying the will of the Legislature into effect".

Representation

Two proposed options for the formation of the legislative branch emerged in the deliberations. One was to form a bicameral legislature in which both chambers had representation proportional to the population of the states, which was supported by the Virginia Plan. The second was to modify the unicameral legislature that had equal representation from all of the states, which was supported by the New Jersey Plan introduced by William Paterson that Sherman helped author. Sherman saw no reason for a bicameralism. He defended the unicameral legislature of the Articles of Confederation by stating that the more populous states had not "suffered at the hands of less populous states on account of the rule of equal voting". Sherman, Elbridge Gerry and others were of the shared opinion that the elected composition of the national government should be reserved for the vote of state officials and not for election by the will of the people. Sherman was wary of allowing ordinary citizen participation in national government and stated that the people "should have as little to do as may be about the Government. They want information and are constantly liable to be misled".

While Sherman was a devout supporter of a unicameral legislature, he recognized that this goal was unattainable because it would not receive the support of the more populous states. With the aide of Oliver Ellsworth, Sherman repeatedly proposed a bicameral compromise where one house had representation proportional to the population, and the other had equal representation for the states. Some scholars have identified Sherman as a pivotal delegate at the Convention because of his role in settling the debate over representation. At important moments in the deliberations, Sherman consistently pushed the interests of the less populous states. When delegates were unable to reconcile the differences between his plan and Madison's Virginia Plan, Sherman helped to get the issue of representation in Congress delegated to a Grand Committee of which he was not only a member but whose membership was sympathetic to the views of the less populous states.

The plan that emerged from the Grand Committee, originally introduced by Sherman, and which known as became the Connecticut Compromise, was designed to be acceptable to both the more and less populous states: the people would be represented proportionally in one branch of the legislature, called the House of Representatives (the lower legislative house). The states would be represented in another house called the Senate (the upper house). In the lower house, each state had a representative for every one delegate. In the upper house, each state was guaranteed two senators, regardless of its size. In terms of modes of election, Sherman supported allowing each state legislature to elect its own senators. In the House, Sherman originally proposed that the suffrage of the House should be figured according to the "numbers of free inhabitants" in each state.

Later career
Sherman was elected as a United States Representative in the First Congress, and then to the Senate in the Second and Third Congress until his death in 1793. In 1790 both Sherman and Richard Law were appointed to revise the confused and archaic Connecticut statutes, which they accomplished. Throughout his life, Sherman was a major benefactor of Yale College, acting as the university's treasurer for many years and promoting construction of a college chapel.

Sherman opposed appointment of fellow signer Gouverneur Morris as minister to France because he considered that high-living Patriot to be of an "irreligious nature".

Death and burial site
Sherman died in his sleep on July 23, 1793, after a two-month illness diagnosed as typhoid fever. The Gazette of the United States (Philadelphia), August 17, 1793, p. 508, reported an alternate diagnosis, "He was taken ill about the middle of May last, and from that time declined till his death. His physician supposed his disorder to be seated in his liver." He was buried in New Haven Green. In 1821, when that cemetery was relocated, his remains were moved to the Grove Street Cemetery.

Jonathan Edwards Jr. gave a funeral sermon at the ceremony for Sherman on July 25, 1793. He praised his contributions to his friends, family, town, and country, noting Sherman's piety and excellence in study.

Legacy

Sherman is especially notable in United States history for being the only person to sign all four great state papers of the United States, the Articles of Association, the United States Declaration of Independence, the Articles of Confederation, and the United States Constitution. Robert Morris, who did not sign the Articles of Association, signed the other three. John Dickinson also signed three, the Continental Association, the Articles of Confederation and the United States Constitution.  He was involved with the Declaration of Independence but abstained, hoping for a reconciliation with Britain.

Sherman is one of the most influential members of the Constitutional Convention. He is not well known for his actions at the Convention because he was a "terse, ineloquent speaker" who never kept a personal record of his experience, unlike other prominent figures. At 66 years of age, Sherman was the second eldest member at the convention following Benjamin Franklin (who was 81 years old at the time). Yet he was a critical opponent of James Madison and the more populous states. Sherman was also one of the most active members of the Convention, making motions or seconds 160 times (compared with Madison's 177 times).

The town of Sherman, Connecticut, was named for Roger Sherman. Sherman, as a member of the Committee of Five, is portrayed on the pediment of the Jefferson Memorial in Washington, D.C..

See also
 List of United States Congress members who died in office (1790–1899)
 Memorial to the 56 Signers of the Declaration of Independence

References

Further reading
 Dictionary of American Biography
 Boardman, Roger Sherman, Roger Sherman, Signer and Statesman, 1938. Reprint. New York: Da Capo Press, 1971.
 Boutell, Lewis Henry, The Life of Roger Sherman, Chicago: A.C. McClurg & Co., 1896.
 Gerber, Scott D., "Roger Sherman and the Bill of Rights." Polity 28 (Summer 1996): 521–540.
 Hoar, George Frisbie, The Connecticut Compromise. Roger Sherman, the Author of the Plan of Equal Representation of the States in the Senate, and Representation of the People in Proportion to Numbers in the House, Worcester, MA: Press of C. Hamilton, 1903.

External links
 From Rev. Charles A. Goodrich, Lives of the Signers to the Declaration of Independence, 1856
 
 
 Baldwin-Greene-Gager family of Connecticut  at Political Graveyard
 Sherman-Hoar family  at Political Graveyard
 Roger Sherman Papers Yale University
 Roger Sherman, Revolutionary and Dedicated Public Servant Connecticut History
 History of Sherman's boyhood home of Stoughton, Massachusetts
 

1721 births
1793 deaths
People from Canton, Massachusetts
People of colonial Massachusetts
People of colonial Connecticut
Sherman family (U.S.)
American people of English descent
American Congregationalists
Continental Congressmen from Connecticut
Signers of the Articles of Confederation
Signers of the Continental Association
Signers of the United States Declaration of Independence
Signers of the United States Constitution
Members of the Connecticut General Assembly Council of Assistants (1662–1818)
Members of the Connecticut House of Representatives
Mayors of New Haven, Connecticut
Connecticut state court judges
Shoemakers
People from New Milford, Connecticut
Lawyers from New Haven, Connecticut
People of Connecticut in the American Revolution
Deaths from typhoid fever
Burials at Grove Street Cemetery
Members of the United States House of Representatives from Connecticut
Founding Fathers of the United States